Minwuia thermotolerans is a species of bacteria.

References

Alphaproteobacteria